The Jewish Museum of São Paulo is a Jewish museum in São Paulo, Brazil. It holds exhibits on Jewish life in Brazil and a collection of over 2,000 items brought over by immigrants to Brazil. The museum's building originated in 1928 as a Byzantine-style synagogue and was lent out to the museum in 2004. Extensive renovations were completed over the course of 17 years, and the museum opened in 2021.

References

External links
 Official website

Museums in Brazil
Religious buildings and structures in São Paulo
Jewish museums
Museums established in 2021
2021 establishments in Brazil